The women's 50 metre backstroke event at the 11th FINA World Swimming Championships (25m) took place 15 – 16 December 2012 at the Sinan Erdem Dome.

Records
Prior to this competition, the existing world and championship records were as follows.

The following records were established during the competition:

Results

Heats

Semifinals

16 swimmers participated in 2 heats.

Final

The final was held at 19:06.

References

Backstroke 050 metre, women's
World Short Course Swimming Championships
2012 in women's swimming